E. J. Thomas has been president and CEO of Habitat for Humanity - Mid Ohio (since 2004). He is responsible for the oversight and operation of one of the nation’s top-40 Habitat affiliates in terms of the number of homes constructed and oversaw a transition that resulted in the blending of Licking County Habitat into the central Ohio service area, which required the name be changed from "Greater Columbus" to the current Mid-Ohio moniker. The organization recently celebrated the milestone of handing the keys to a new home to the 1,000th family in early 2021. In addition to managing the efforts requisite to funding and building homes throughout Franklin and Licking Counties, “ReStore” production has increased significantly during his tenure. Recognized by his peers in the central Ohio business community, he was awarded CEO Magazine’s, “CEO of the Year” for large non-profit organizations. He is immediate past chair of the State Support Organization of Habitat for Humanity Ohio, an organization that assists the 65 affiliates in the state by way of Statehouse advocacy efforts, and individualized training of affiliate staff in best practices, grants writing, and infrastructure acquisition.

Formerly, Thomas served as an elected member of the Habitat for Humanity International’s (HFHI) U.S. Council, the body that advises HFHI staff and the International Board on the direction and priorities of U.S. programs and helps in empowering affiliates throughout the U.S. These 20 members from among the 1,150 affiliates across the country advise on all aspects of Habitat’s work within the U.S., develop programs and initiatives that enhance the Habitat mission, recommend policy, and serve as a sounding board for ideas to HFHI. In this capacity he served as Chairman of its Advocacy Committee and co-chair of HFHI’s Veterans Initiative Advisory Committee. 

Thomas is also a former member of the Ohio House of Representatives, serving from 1984 to 1999. He concluded his tenure as State Representative for the 27th District in north Columbus, having been elected a total of eight terms. He specialized in state fiscal policy, serving as Chairman of both the Ways & Means and Finance & Appropriations Committees. In the latter role, he was directly responsible for legislative approval of five budgets totaling $44 billion. It is with this experience that he continues working with HFHI’s Government Relations & Advocacy Office in Washington, D.C. 

Thomas is retired from the USAF and the Ohio Air National Guard after 32 years in the military, during which time he was an instructor pilot and Director of Operations for the state's 5,000+ member force. He was credited with flying 32 missions during the first Persian Gulf War. Thomas is past Chairman of the Ohio Unemployment Compensation Review Commission, during which time he had responsibility for some 30 attorneys who remain the Commission’s Hearing Officers along with an administrative support staff of 27 professionals. Each year the Commission considers 25,000+ cases brought by both employers and employees. The Commission is the independent appeals forum for cases related to disputed unemployment claims. He has been active in the central Ohio community, where he was cofounder and chair of the Affordable Housing Alliance of Central Ohio. Previously, he served three terms as trustee on the Board of Capital University where he chaired the Integrity & Compliance Committee, Chair of the Franklin County Human Service Chamber. Thomas has extensive experience on various boards such as the Columbus Zoo, the local Cancer Society, and the Columbus Symphony Orchestra (CSO). He cofounded the CSO’s successful “Picnic with the Pops” summer series. Thomas is married to Randi Marie Thomas (Ostry), an attorney and former constitutional law litigator, and is the father of three children, Edward J. Thomas, III, Alicia Layne Thomas, and Rose Victoria Thomas.

References

Living people
Members of the Ohio House of Representatives
Place of birth missing (living people)
Year of birth missing (living people)
20th-century American politicians